Hamano (written:  or ) is a Japanese surname. Notable people with the surname include:

, Japanese photographer
, Japanese golfer
Junio Hamano, Japanese software developer
Kazco Hamano (born 1970), Japanese singer
, Japanese musician, composer and actor
, Japanese film director
, Japanese archer
, Japanese football player

See also
Hamano Station, a railway station in Chiba, Chiba Prefecture, Japan

Japanese-language surnames